The Rebra is a right tributary of the river Someșul Mare in Romania. Its source is in the Rodna Mountains. It discharges into the Someșul Mare near Rebrișoara. The upper reach of the river, upstream from the confluence with the Gușatul Mare at Gura Rebra, is also known as Rebrișoara.

References

Rivers of Romania
Rivers of Bistrița-Năsăud County